Melicope degeneri is a rare species of flowering plant in the family Rutaceae known by the common names Kokee Stream melicope and Degener's pelea. It is endemic to Hawaii, where it is known only from the island of Kauai. It is a federally listed endangered species of the United States. Like other Hawaiian Melicope, this species is known as alani.

This is a shrub or tree with oppositely arranged leaves, flowers usually in clusters of three, and cube-shaped fruits. It grows in wet mountain forests.

The type specimen of this plant was collected in 1926. The species was not seen again and was thought to be extinct until its 1993 rediscovery. Today there are 22 or 23 known individuals.

This plant is threatened by the degradation of its habitat by the activity of feral goats and pigs and competition with non-native plants.

References

degeneri
Endemic flora of Hawaii
Biota of Kauai